Dongguan West railway station (Chinese: 东莞西站;) is a railway station in Daojiao, Dongguan, Guangdong, China. 

The station has two levels. The lower level has east-west platforms which serve as the western terminus of the Dongguan–Huizhou intercity railway and the eastern terminus of the currently under construction Foshan–Dongguan intercity railway. The upper level has north-south platforms which serve the Guangzhou–Shenzhen intercity railway.

In the future, the station will be served by Line 1 of the Dongguan Rail Transit.

History
The station opened on 15 December 2019 along with the first stage of the Guangzhou–Shenzhen intercity railway and an extension to the Dongguan–Huizhou intercity railway.

References

Railway stations in Guangdong
Railway stations in China opened in 2019